Vyankojirajah Bhonsle (born 1632) or Ekojirajah I Bhonsle was the younger half-brother of Shivaji and founder of Maratha rule in Thanjavur in modern day Tamil Nadu. He was the progenitor of the junior branch of the Bhonsle family which ruled Thanjavur until the formal annexation of the kingdom by the British in 1855.

Early career 
Venkoji was the younger son of Shahaji, a military commander in service of the Sultan of Bijapur through his younger wife Tukabai Mohite. He succeeded to the Karnataka portion of Shahaji's empire.

Conquest of Thanjavur 

In 1673, the Nayak of Madurai invaded the kingdom of Thanjavur under the rule of the Thanjavur Nayaks and drove away the ruler. He then proceeded to place his younger brother Alagiri Nayak on the throne of Thanjavur. This was resented by Rayasam Venkanna, a high-ranking official in the court of Thanjavur who supported the cause of Chengamala Dasu, the deposed son of Vijayaraghava, the late Nayak of Thanjavur.  He proceeded to the court of the Ali Adil Shahi II of Bijapur along with the minor Chengamaldas and requested his help.

The Adil Shah sent Venkoji to invade Thanjavur and restore the throne to the old line of nayaks. A Sanskrit manuscript Bosalavamsavali narrates how Venkoji conquered Arni and proceeded to Thanjavur to liberate it from the shackles of the Nayak of Tiruchirapalli. The manuscript further narrates that While camping at Tirumalapadi near Tiruvadi, God appeared to him in a dream and asked him not to leave for home. However, Wilkes assigns different reasons for the usurpation of the Maratha. He is of the view that Venkoji was not pleased with the conduct of Chengamaldas who refused to pay the war expenses.

Assisted by Rayasam Venkanna who had switched sides once more, Venkoji conquered Ayyampettai and defeated Alagiri who had now also fallen out with his brother Chokkanatha Nayak as well as Changamaldas and secured the throne for himself. On the death of the Sultan of Bijapur, he crowned himself as the independent king of Thanjavur.

Reign

Dates of Ekoji I's reign 

The Marathi inscriptions of the Thanjavur temple dates the capture of Thanjavur to January 1676. The Madras Tamil manuscript assigns the dates 1675 and 1679 to the conquest and end of Ekoji I's reign respectively. Likewise, the Marathi inscriptions assigns Ekoji's death to 1684. However, Wilkes asserts that Ekoji was well alive in 1686-1687. The records of the British East India Company mention a king called Ekoji as late as 1699-1700.

However, Dharmakuta a commentary on the Ramayana suggests that Ekoji might have abdicated in the year 1684 in favor of his son Shahuji. However, it is quite unclear as to how many years he lived after the event.

Clash with Shivaji 
In 1676-1677 Shivaji made an expedition to the Carnatic to claim his portion of the jagir, also desiring to bring the whole of South India under Maratha rule. With this aim in mind, he made a treaty with Golconda, took Gingee and proceeded to Thanjavur after conquering all the lands north of the Coleroon river. But a Mughal Empire invasion forced him to turn back. He placed Vellore under the rule of a half-brother named Santoji. Ekoji I reacted by launching regular military campaigns into Santoji's territory with the intention of driving him away. However, in 1680, Bijapur succumbed to the invasions of Shivaji and handed over the administration of all lands to the north of the Coleroon river to Shivaji. Ekoji I was forced to become a vassal of Shivaji and pay him tribute. On the death of Shivaji, however, the tribute was stopped and Thanjavur retained its independent existence.

Alliance with Ramnad 
The chiefs of Ramnad had been vassals of the Nayaks of Madurai. However, the new ruler Kilavan desired to become independent. With this aim in mind, he concluded an alliance with Ekoji and rebelled against his overlord. The battle ended in the reign of Shahuji I with the defeat of Madurai and the liberation of Ramnad.

Literature 
Sanskrit and Telugu literature flourished during this period. Venkoji himself is said to have composed a Telugu version of the Ramayana.

See also
 Maratha Empire
 List of Maratha dynasties and states
 Thanjavur Maratha kingdom

Notes

References 

1629 births
Maharajas of Thanjavur
Year of death uncertain